Anna von Palen (26 May 1875 – 27 January 1939) was a German film actress of the silent era. She appeared in 74 films between 1915 and 1938. She was born in Perleberg, Germany and died in Berlin, Germany.

Selected filmography

 When the Heart Burns with Hate (1917)
 The Enchanted Princess (1919)
 Die Todeskarawane (1920)
 Mascotte (1920)
 The Hustler (1920)
 The Woman Without a Soul (1920)
 Auf den Trümmern des Paradieses (1920)
 Der Bucklige und die Tänzerin (1920)
 The Lord of the Beasts (1921)
 The Railway King (1921)
 Shame (1922)
 The Sensational Trial (1923)
 Black Earth (1923)
 Set Me Free (1924)
 The Doll of Luna Park (1925)
 The Salesgirl from the Fashion Store (1925)
 The Pink Slippers (1927)
 The Bordello in Rio (1927)
  The Lorelei (1927)
 Under the Lantern (1928)
 Anastasia, the False Czar's Daughter (1928)
 Scandal in Baden-Baden (1929)
 At the Strasbourg (1934)
 Blood Brothers (1935)
 Fanny Elssler (1937)

References

External links

1875 births
1939 deaths
German stage actresses
German film actresses
German silent film actresses
20th-century German actresses